Kaltenbach is a river of Baden-Württemberg, Germany. It is a right tributary of the Dürnach and belongs to the Danube river system. Most of the river flows through forest, and then flows into the Dürnach south-west of Wennedach.

See also
List of rivers of Baden-Württemberg

Rivers of Baden-Württemberg
Rivers of Germany